Nitish Veera (1975/6 – 17 May 2021) was an Indian actor who worked in Tamil-language films.

Career 
Veera portrayed small roles in several of them including Pudhupettai (2006) and Vennila Kabadi Kuzhu (2009). He contacted Pa. Ranjith who gave him the role of Kathiravan, Rajinikanth and Eashwari Rao's son in Kaala (2018). He shot for the film for 40 days. Veera went on to portray an important role in Asuran (2019). In the film, he played a character that lived in the 1960s. He was signed to play a pivotal role in Laabam. The post production of his upcoming film BELL is in progress and in slated for late 2021 to early 2022 release. He recently completed dubbing for his part in the film.

Death
He died from COVID-19 on 17 May 2021, at the age of 45.

Filmography

References

External links 

1970s births
Year of birth uncertain
2021 deaths
Indian male film actors
Male actors in Tamil cinema
Deaths from the COVID-19 pandemic in India